Xavier Intes is a French professor of physics and biomedical engineering and co-director of the BioImaging Center at the Rensselaer Polytechnic Institute.

Life and career
Intes had obtained his B.S., M.S. and Ph.D. degrees in physics from University of Western Brittany in 1992, 1994, and 1998 respectively. In 1999 he joined Britton Chance's laboratory as a postdoc at the University of Pennsylvania and under his mentorship studied biochemistry and biophysics of radiology. He also did postdoctoral training at the Department of Astronomy and Physics where Arjun Yodh was his mentor. From 2001-2003, he served as the director at the Research of the Medical Diagnostic Research Foundation and at the Research of Optical Devices. He also served as Chief Scientist in Advanced Research Technologies from 2003-2006.  Since 2006, he is a part of Rensselaer Polytechnic Institute's faculty where he now currently serves as a Professor in the Department of Biomedical Engineering.

Awards and fellowships
Fellow of the AIMBE (2016)
Fellow of the SPIE (2019)
Fellow of the OSA (2019)

References

External links

20th-century births
Living people
University of Western Brittany alumni
University of Pennsylvania alumni
Rensselaer Polytechnic Institute faculty
Northeastern University faculty
Fellows of the American Institute for Medical and Biological Engineering
21st-century French physicists
Year of birth missing (living people)
Place of birth missing (living people)